The following are the Pulitzer Prizes for 1924.

Journalism awards
Public Service:
New York World, for its work exposing the killing of Martin Tabert, which helped bring the convict leasing system in Florida to an end
Reporting:
Magner White, San Diego Sun, for his story of the eclipse of the sun.
Editorial Writing:
Boston Herald, for an editorial entitled "Who Made Coolidge?"
 Special prize of $1000 was awarded to the widow of Frank I. Cobb, New York World, in recognition of the distinction of her husband's editorial writing and service.

Editorial Cartooning:
Jay Norwood Darling of the Des Moines Register and Tribune for "In Good Old USA".

Letters and Drama Awards
Novel:
The Able McLaughlins by Margaret Wilson (Harper)
Drama:
Hell-Bent Fer Heaven by Hatcher Hughes (Harper)
History:
The American Revolution—A Constitutional Interpretation by Charles Howard McIlwain (Macmillan)
Biography or Autobiography:
From Immigrant to Inventor by Michael I. Pupin (Scribner)
Poetry:
New Hampshire: A Poem with Notes and Grace Notes by Robert Frost (Holt)

References

External links
Pulitzer Prizes for 1924

Pulitzer Prizes by year
Pulitzer Prize
Pulitzer Prize